Albert Victor Waters (May 10, 1896 – May 4, 1953) was a lawyer and political figure in Ontario. He represented Cochrane in the Legislative Assembly of Ontario from 1926 to 1934 as a Conservative member.

He was born in Toronto in 1896, the son of Alfred William Waters and Adda Grannard. Waters was educated in Toronto and at Osgoode Hall. In 1922, he married Florence Grace Hall. He served as a second lieutenant in the Royal Air Force in 1918. He died after an illness of three weeks in 1953.

References

External links

1890s births
1953 deaths
Progressive Conservative Party of Ontario MPPs